Pu Shu (born 1973) is a Chinese singer-songwriter who was born in Nanjing and grew up in Beijing. In 1994, he quit studying at Capital Normal University and started composing songs. He became a signed singer in Taihe Rye Music's Mai Tian Music in 1996. His signature works are "Flowers" and "Birch Forest". He also has performed in films like Flowers Blooming and If I Lose You.  After a break of 11 years he published the new song "The Ordinary Road" as theme song for the Chinese film The Continent in 2014.

Movies

Albums

External links

References

Chinese male singer-songwriters
Living people
Male actors from Jiangsu
Musicians from Nanjing
Male actors from Nanjing
Singers from Nanjing
Chinese male film actors
20th-century Chinese  male  singers
21st-century Chinese  male singers
1971 births